Agonopterix multiplicella is a moth of the family Depressariidae. It is found from Italy, Austria, Slovakia, Poland, Ukraine, the Baltic region, Denmark, Sweden, Finland and Russia to Japan.

The wingspan is 18–19 mm.

The larvae feed on Artemisia vulgaris.

References

External links
lepiforum.de

Moths described in 1877
Agonopterix
Moths of Asia
Moths of Europe